Maurice Leroy (born 2 February 1959) is a French politician who served as Minister of City Affairs under President Nicolas Sarkozy in the third government of Prime Minister François Fillon from November 2010 to May 2012. In this capacity, he was in charge of the Grand Paris project.

He was a Member of Parliament from 1997 to 2010 and 2012 to 2019.

Political career 
From 1997 to 2010 and again from 2012 to 2019, Leroy was a member of the National Assembly of France, representing Loir-et-Cher's 3rd constituency. During that time, he was a member of the Union of Democrats and Independents as a part of The Centrists. While in the opposition, he criticized the Socialist government for blocking necessary investments for the Grand Paris project.

In September 2012, Leroy became the spokesman of the Union of Democrats and Independents (UDI) created by Jean-Louis Borloo. He left the New Centre in conflict with his leader, Hervé Morin.

Ahead of the 2012 French presidential election, Leroy endorsed Nicolas Sarkozy as the center-right parties' joint candidate.

Later career 
After his resignation from parliament, Leroy accepted the offer by Mayor of Moscow Sergey Sobyanin to become deputy general manager of the state-owned company Mosinjproekt, in charge of managing projects of Greater Moscow, for a monthly salary of 10,000 euros.

References 

1959 births
Living people
Politicians from Paris
Union for French Democracy politicians
The Centrists politicians
Deputies of the 12th National Assembly of the French Fifth Republic
Deputies of the 13th National Assembly of the French Fifth Republic
Deputies of the 14th National Assembly of the French Fifth Republic
Deputies of the 15th National Assembly of the French Fifth Republic
Union of Democrats and Independents politicians